Breckenbrough School is a private registered charitable trust school in Sandhutton, North Yorkshire, England.

Breckenbrough School was founded in 1934 by Arthur Fitch, a Quaker psychiatrist, at Dunnow Hall, Slaidburn. It moved to Ledston Hall near Castleford in 1948, and has been at Breckenbrough Hall, Sandhutton, since 1958. It is one of seven Quaker schools in England.

A 2013 Ofsted social care inspection report judged the school to be overall Grade 2 (good), and a report in 2021 stated that the school "requires improvement".

Therapeutic provision 
The school employs a full-time psychologist who works directly with pupils and parents. She also supports teachers, learning support stuff and social education. This is important for developing strategies and plans for pupils. She is also available to support pupils in their transition away from the school ('After Care').

See also
List of Friends Schools

References

Further reading
 Breckenbrough Papers, 1934 – 1975 (1987)
 Calvert, J.  Breckenbrough School – School History. (1985).  Covers the first 50 years.
 Knox, Rob The 2009 History of Breckenbrough School – Quaker influence in an educational experiment (2009)   (2010)

External links
 Breckenbrough School index page
 Guardian article on marketing

Quaker schools in England
Schools for people on the autistic spectrum
Special schools in North Yorkshire
Educational institutions established in 1934
1934 establishments in England
Private schools in North Yorkshire
Autism-related organisations in the United Kingdom